Admiral Wilhelm Dyrssen (26 March 1858 – 14 July 1929), was a Swedish Navy officer. He served as Minister for Naval Affairs from 1906 to 1907.

Early life
Dyrssen was born on 26 March 1858 at Klagstorps mansion in Hagelberg Parish, Skaraborg County. He was the son of the landowner Peder Johan Julius Dyrssen and his wife Gustafva Wilhelmina (née Hagerman). Dyrssen was younger brother to Gerhard Dyrssen (1854–1938) and twin brother of Gustaf Dyrssen (1858–1934).

Career
He and his twin brother Gustaf graduated from the Royal Swedish Naval Academy in autumn 1877. Dyrssen devoted himself as an officer first at the technology of the naval artillery and then to staff duty and advancing to higher positions at sea. He studied at the Artillery and Engineering College from 1880 to 1883, becoming a sub-lieutenant in 1882. From 1883 to 1885, Dyrssen participated in the frigate Vanadis global circumnavigation. After returning home he served at the Royal Swedish Naval Materiel Administration from 1887 to 1889 and as a teacher at the Royal Swedish Naval Academy from 1886 to 1893 and as a cadet officer from 1892 to 1893. Dyrssen became lieutenant in 1888 and served in the Fleet Staff from 1889 to 1892 and was head of the Artillery Department at the Naval Station in Karlskrona from 1894 to 1899. In 1899, he became head of the Artillery Department at the Royal Swedish Naval Materiel Administration, a position he stayed in until 1904. Dyrssen was promoted to commander of second rank in 1898 and of first rank in 1901 and captain in 1903.

In addition to this, he was hired as an expert on various issues relating to the navy, including the 1902 Warships Building Committee. After being Minister for Naval Affairs from 1906 to 1907 in Arvid Lindman's first cabinet, he was called as a member of the committee, which had the task of examining the issue of an adequate coastal defence ship type and whose work resulted in the then under the political feuds much talked-about F-type. He was appointed rear admiral already at 46 years of age in 1904 and became Inspector of the Navy's Exercises at Sea, a position he stayed in until 1916. In 1905, Dyrssen became the Highest Commander (högste befälhavare) of the Coastal Fleet. In this position, he got the opportunity to develop an unshakable calm as well as other solid commander qualities, especially during preparedness along the Swedish west coast in connection with Union crisis in 1905. As inspector he demonstrated an extraordinarily confident glance and an infallible judgment. On his responsible post, he remained even during the first stage of World War I. In 1910, Dyrssen became a military member of the Supreme Court of Sweden and in the year after, he was promoted to vice admiral. He resigned from the position of Highest Commander of the Coastal Fleet in 1916, and was appointed station commander in Stockholm. He left active service in 1923 and thereby received the highest of the three admiralty ranks.

Later life
The last years he devoted himself mainly to the management of his property Öråker near Mälarestäket and he also took a leading position as vice chairman in Sweden's Agricultural Employers Central Association (Sveriges lantarbetsgivares centralförening), and chairman of the General Electoral League (Allmänna valmansförbundet) in Uppsala County.

Dyrssen became a member of the Royal Swedish Society of Naval Sciences in 1893 and honorary member in 1904. He became a member of the Royal Swedish Academy of War Sciences in 1899. Dyrssen was editor of the journal Tidskrift i Sjöväsendet from 1894 to 1898.

Personal life
In 1888, Dyrssen was married to baroness Lizinka af Ugglas (1866–1952), the daughter of Gustaf af Ugglas and Therese Björnstjerna. He was the father of Gustaf Dyrssen and Magnus Dyrssen.

Dates of rank
1877 – Underlöjtnant
1881 – Sub-lieutenant
1888 – Lieutenant
1898 – Lieutenant commander
1901 – Commander
1903 – Captain
1911 – Rear admiral
1917 – Vice admiral
1923 – Admiral

Awards

Swedish
  Knight and Commander of the Orders of His Majesty the King (Order of the Seraphim) (1928)
  Commander Grand Cross of the Order of the Sword (6 June 1912)
  Commander 1st Class of the Order of the Sword (1 December 1905)
  Knight 1st Class of the Order of the Sword (1897)
  Knight of the Order of the Polar Star (1900)

Foreign
  Grand Cross of the Order of the Dannebrog (1913)
  Grand Cross of the Order of the White Rose of Finland (1919)
  Grand Cross of the Order of the Black Star (between 1909 and 1915)
  Knight Grand Cross of the Order of Saints Maurice and Lazarus (between 1909 and 1915)
  Knight 1st Class of the Order of the Red Eagle (between 1909 and 1915)
  Knight 4th Class of the Order of the Red Eagle (between 1881 and 1905)
  Knight 1st Class of the Order of the Crown (between 1905 and 1908)
  Knight 1st Class of the Order of St. Anna (between 1909 and 1915)
  Knight 1st Class of the Order of Saint Stanislaus (between 1909 and 1915)
  Grand Cross of the Royal Victorian Order (17 November 1908)
  Commander of the Legion of Honour (between 1908 and 1909)
  Officer of the Legion of Honour (between 1881 and 1905)
  Officer of the Royal Order of the Crown of Hawaii (1884)

References

1858 births
1929 deaths
Swedish Navy admirals
People from Skövde Municipality
Members of the Royal Swedish Society of Naval Sciences
Members of the Royal Swedish Academy of War Sciences
Commanders Grand Cross of the Order of the Sword
Knights of the Order of the Polar Star
Grand Crosses of the Order of the Dannebrog
Knights Grand Cross of the Order of Saints Maurice and Lazarus
Honorary Knights Grand Cross of the Royal Victorian Order
Swedish twins